The National Bureau of Corruption Prevention was an agency of the People's Republic of China under the direct administration of the State Council. It was established in 2007 with the objective of improving government transparency, developing and improving the mechanisms through which corruption was combatted, and coordinating anti-corruption efforts. The bureau also seeks cooperation on corruption prevention at the multilateral level.

Upon its inauguration, the National Bureau of Corruption Prevention established a website to publicize events and post corruption-related news. The website also provides citizens with a forum to directly submit complaints of corruption and opinions on the government's work. Within hours of its launch, the site crashed under the volume of complaints.

The Bureau was a distinct entity from the Communist Party's Central Discipline Inspection Commission, which is charged with investigating corruption and disciplinary infractions within party ranks. The CCDI operates independent of the government (i.e., the State Council), and its jurisdiction is limited to party members. Moreover, the CCDI may initiate investigations for infractions not necessarily related to corruption nor constituting a criminal offense, such as having a "lavish lifestyle" unbecoming of a Communist Party member, or even extramarital relationships.

On 13 March 2018 the National Bureau of Corruption Prevention was merged into National Supervisory Commission.

See also
 Corruption in the People's Republic of China

References

External links
Official website of the NBCP

2007 establishments in China
Corruption in China
Government agencies established in 2007
Government agencies of China
State Council of the People's Republic of China